Godela Habel (born 18 September 1929 in Deutsch Krone, Posen-West Prussia, Weimar Germany; died 12 February 2022 in Potsdam) was a German painter and artist.

Life and work 

Godela Habel studied from 1950 to 1953 at the art schools of Wuppertal and Hanover, focusing on painting and graphic design. She is known for her paintings and collages. She combined the methods of drawing and painting in her occasionally secretive work and made allowance for individual associations and interpretations. In February 2000 she displayed at an exhibition about "The Paint Theme" (German: "Thema Farbe") in the Künstlerforum at Bonn some more or less compacted lines and areas on paper and used paint in minutely shaded levels of brown, white and black, which were infiltrated by a hint of red. In the 1990s she completed her work on collages and focuses since then on drawings. She lives and works in Mehren.

Awards 

Godela Habel obtained 1998 the GEDOK art award with a value of 5,000,-€, which was donated in 1988 as the Dr.-Theobald-Simon-Award by the art lover and patron Gabriele Vossebein in the memory of her father, the former director of the Bitburger brewery.

Exhibitions 

 1982: 7 Artists, Bonn Bad Godesberg
 1984: Winter exhibition, Arbeitsgemeinschaft Siegerländer Künstlerinnen und Künstler e.V. 
 1986: Individual exhibitions in Kunstverein Siegen e.V. Protestant Academy Schmitten-Arnoldsheim and glas museum Rheinbach
 1989: Individual exhibition in Gärtnerhaus Bonn
 1997: Akquisition of a drawing by Rheinische Landesmuseum Bonn
 2000: The Paint Theme, Künstlerforum Bonn
 2002: Wechselweise, Arbeitsgemeinschaft Siegerländer Künstlerinnen und Künstler e.V.
 2003: Individual exhibition in Betzdorf
 2004: Individual exhibition im Gärtnerhaus Bonn
 2005: Korrespondenzen, Künstlerforum Bonn
 2006: Einzelausstellung in der Theatergemeinde Bonn
 2009: Works on Paper, Theatergemeinde Bonn
 2014: Collages and Drawings from 14 June until 13 July 2014 in the "Kleiner Kunstraum 21" of Gotthart Eichhorn in Geiselbach

Publications 
 Ursula Toyka-Fuong, Petra Rapp-Neumann, Hilla Jablonsky, Ruth Schirmer, Edith Oellers-Teuber, Ula Wienke, Margaret Klare, Ute Jansen, Irene Kulnig, Borghild Eckermann, Godela Habel, Susanne Krell, Elsbeth Tatarczyk-Welte, Victoria Westmacott-Wrede: Ausgezeichnet: Künstlerinnen und Stifterin des Dr.-Theobald-Simon-Kunstpreises. . (German)

References 

German women painters
German graphic designers
Women graphic designers
1929 births
Living people
People from Wałcz
People from West Prussia
20th-century German painters
20th-century German women artists
21st-century German artists
21st-century German women artists
University of Wuppertal alumni